Kamaladdin Pirmoazzen (born 1959) is an Iranian reformist politician. 
Pirmoazzen was born in Ardabil. He was a member of the 9th Islamic Consultative Assembly from the electorate of Ardabil, Nir, Namin and Sareyn with Mansour Haghighatpour and Mostafa Afzalifard. Pirmoazzen won with 90,634 (35.36%) votes.

References

People from Ardabil
Deputies of Ardabil, Nir, Namin and Sareyn
Living people
1959 births
Members of the 9th Islamic Consultative Assembly
Imam Sadiq University alumni
Iranian reformists
Mayors of Ardabil
Followers of Wilayat fraction members